Border of Reality is the third studio album by German heavy metal band Angel Dust, released in 1998.

Track listing 
"Border of Reality" – 4:52
"No More Faith" – 4:12
"Nightmare" – 4:43
"Centuries" – 5:19
"When I Die" – 9:45
"Where the Wind Blows" – 7:36
"Spotlight Kid" (Rainbow cover) – 4:22
"Behind the Mirror" – 8:17
"Coming Home" – 5:58
"Easy Livin'" – 2:37 (Uriah Heep cover)

Credits 
Dirk Thurisch – vocals, guitar
Frank Banx – bass, vocals
Steven Banx – keyboards
Dirk Assmuth – drums
Bernd Aufermann – guitar

References 

1998 albums
Angel Dust (German band) albums
Century Media Records albums